Leonardo Castro may refer to:

Leonardo Castro (footballer, born 1989), Colombian football forward for Kaizer Chiefs	
Leonardo Castro (footballer, born 1992), Colombian football forward for Independiente Medellín